The Eumeralla Formation is a geological formation in Victoria, Australia whose strata date back to the Early Cretaceous. It is Aptian to Albian in age. Dinosaur remains are among the fossils that have been recovered from the formation, particularly from the Dinosaur Cove locality It is partially equivalent to the Wonthaggi Formation.

Geology 
The Eumeralla Formation was deposited within an extensional rift valley formed between Australia and Antarctica. The lithology primarily consists of fluvially deposited siliciclastics derived from volcanic material. The strata of the Eumeralla Formation are folded as a result of northwest–southeast crustal compression during the Neogene, which also reactivated some Cretaceous aged normal faults.

Paleobiota 
Indeterminate dinosaur tracks named as Skolithos sp. and Arenicolites sp., as well as indeterminate ornithischian tracks are present in Victoria, Australia. Indeterminate ornithopod remains are present at Eric the Red West locality and Elliot River, including material that possibly belongs to a new taxon. Indeterminate theropod and possible indeterminate dromaeosaurid remains are present in Victoria, Australia. An indeterminate unenlagiine is known from the formation.

See also 
 List of dinosaur-bearing rock formations
 South Polar region of the Cretaceous

References 

Geologic formations of Australia
Cretaceous System of Australia
Early Cretaceous Australia
Albian Stage
Aptian Stage
Sandstone formations
Siltstone formations
Mudstone formations
Conglomerate formations
Fluvial deposits
Fossiliferous stratigraphic units of Oceania
Paleontology in Victoria
Geology of Victoria (Australia)